The word dulcimer refers to two families of musical string instruments.

Hammered dulcimers
The word dulcimer originally referred to a trapezoidal zither similar to a psaltery whose many strings are struck by handheld "hammers". Variants of this instrument are found in many cultures, including:
 Hammered dulcimer (England, Scotland, United States)
 Hackbrett (southern Germany, Austria, Switzerland)
 Tsymbaly (Ukraine), tsimbl (Ashkenazi Jewish), țambal (Romania) and cimbalom (Hungary) may refer to either a relatively small folk instrument or a larger classical instrument. The santouri (Greece) (called "santur" in the Ottoman Empire) is almost identical to the Jewish and Romanian folk instruments.
 Santur (Iran and Iraq)
 Santoor (northern India and Pakistan) is constructed and tuned differently from the santur of Iran and Iraq
 Khim (Cambodia, Laos, Thailand)
 Yangqin (China), Đàn tam thập lục (Vietnam), yanggeum (Korea)

Appalachian dulcimer and derivatives

In the Appalachian region of the U.S. in the nineteenth century, hammered dulcimers were rare. There, the word dulcimer, which was familiar from the King James Version of the Bible, was used to refer to a three or four stringed fretted instrument, generally played on the lap by strumming. 

Variants include:
 The original Appalachian dulcimer
 Various twentieth century derivatives, including
 Banjo dulcimer, with banjo-like resonating membrane
 Resonator dulcimer, with inset conical resonator
 Bowed dulcimer, teardrop-shaped and played upright with a bow
 Electric dulcimer, various types of dulcimer which use a pickup to amplify the sound

References

Early musical instruments
English musical instruments
Zithers